Eva Brenda Fowler (February 16, 1883 - October 27, 1942) was an American actress and writer.

Early life
Brenda Fowler was born on February 16, 1883, in Jamestown, North Dakota as Eva Brenda Fowler.

Career
In 1905, Fowler was a member of the New Ulrich stock theater company. In the early 1910s, she acted for two years in Honolulu, Hawaii, with the American Stock Company. She also acted with the Morosco Stock Company in Los Angeles.

Fowler performed in vaudeville in sketches that included The Hyphen, which had a patriotic theme. On Broadway, She appeared in The Rack (1911) and Luck in Pawn (1919).

Fowler left the stage to act in films, beginning with Money, Money, Money, a production of Preferred Pictures in 1922. Her first talking film was The World Moves On (1934). Her later films included The Case Against Mrs. Ames, and Comin' Round the Mountain (1940). She played shrewish woman in two John Ford films: As the sister of Will Rogers in Judge Priest (1934) and as the wife of the corrupt banker (played by Berton Churchill) in Stagecoach (1939).

Fowler was also a writer, collaborating with Ethel Clifton on scripts. Twenty of their one-act plays were presented on top-level vaudeville circuits.

Personal life
Fowler was married to John W. Sherman, and they had a daughter.

Death
On October 27, 1942, Fowler died after a brief illness.

Filmography

References

External links

 some actor film credits(Aveleyman)

1883 births
1942 deaths
American film actresses
American stage actresses
20th-century American actresses